is  the Head coach of the Nagoya Diamond Dolphins in the Japanese B.League.

Career statistics 

|-
| align="left" | 2007-13
| align="left" | Mitsubishi
| 162 || || 24.5|| .333 || .363 || .754 || 2.0 || 1.0 || 0.5 || 0.1 ||  5.8
|-

Head coaching record

|-
| style="text-align:left;"|Nagoya Diamond Dolphins
| style="text-align:left;"|2017-18
| 60||31||29|||| style="text-align:center;"| 2nd in Central|||3||1||2||
| style="text-align:center;"|Lost in 1st round
|-
| style="text-align:left;"|Nagoya Diamond Dolphins
| style="text-align:left;"|2018-19
| 60||33||27|||| style="text-align:center;"| 2nd in Western|||3||1||2||
| style="text-align:center;"|Lost in 1st round
|-
| style="text-align:left;"|Nagoya Diamond Dolphins
| style="text-align:left;"|2019-20
| 41||17||24|||| style="text-align:center;"| 5th in Western|||-||-||-||
| style="text-align:center;"|-
|-

References

External links 

1976 births
Living people

Japanese basketball coaches
Nagoya Diamond Dolphins coaches
Nagoya Diamond Dolphins players
Nihon University Red Sharks men's basketball players